The , also known as the Nevada-tan murder, was the murder of a 12-year-old Japanese schoolgirl, by an 11-year-old female classmate referred to as "Girl A" (a common placeholder name used for female criminals in Japan). The murder occurred on June 1, 2004, at an elementary school in the city of Sasebo in Nagasaki Prefecture. The murderer slit Mitarai's throat and arms with a box cutter.

Reactions to the incident included Internet memes and a discussion of lowering the age of criminal responsibility in Japan. The killer's name has not been released to the press, as per Japanese legal procedures prohibiting the identification of juvenile offenders; The Nagasaki District Legal Affairs Bureau cautioned Internet users against revealing her photos. However, the girl's name was accidentally revealed on a Fuji TV broadcast, and members of the Japanese Internet community 2channel publicized her identity on June 18, 2004, based on analysis of a picture broadcast on television.

Murder
On June 1, 2004, an 11-year-old schoolgirl, later dubbed "Girl A", murdered her 12-year-old classmate, Satomi Mitarai, in an empty classroom during the lunch hour at Okubo Elementary School in Sasebo, Nagasaki Prefecture. Girl A returned to her classroom, her clothes covered in blood. The girls' teacher, who had noticed that both girls were missing, stumbled upon the body and called the police.

After being taken into custody, Girl A was reported to have confessed to the crime, saying "I am sorry, I am sorry" to police officers. She spent the night at the police station, often crying, and refusing to eat or drink. Girl A initially mentioned no motive for the killing. Shortly afterward, she confessed to police that she and Mitarai had quarreled as a result of messages left on the Internet. Girl A claimed that Mitarai slandered her by commenting on her weight and calling her a "goody-goody".

On September 15, 2004, a Japanese Family Court ruled to institutionalize Girl A, putting aside her young age because of the severity of the crime. She was sent to a reformatory in Tochigi Prefecture. The Nagasaki family court originally sentenced Girl A to two years of involuntary commitment, but the sentence was extended by two years in September 2006, following a psychological evaluation. On May 29, 2008, local authorities announced that they did not seek an additional sentence.

Because of her issues with communication and obsessive interests, Girl A was diagnosed after the murder with Asperger syndrome.

Reaction
The killing provoked a debate in Japan whether the age of criminal responsibility, lowered from 16 to 14 in 2000 due to the 1997 Kobe child murders, needed to be lowered again. Girl A was considered to be a normal and well-adjusted child before the incident, which made the public more anxious.

Members of the Japanese Diet, such as Kiichi Inoue and Sadakazu Tanigaki, came under criticism for comments made in the wake of the killing. Inoue was criticized for referring to Girl A as genki (vigorous, lively), a word with positive connotations. Tanigaki was criticized for referring to the method of killing, slitting of the throat, as a "manly" act.

Girl A became the subject of an Internet meme on Japanese web communities such as 2channel. She was nicknamed "Nevada-tan" because a class photograph showed a young girl believed to be her wearing a University of Nevada, Reno sweatshirt, with "-tan" being a childlike pronunciation of the Japanese honorific suffix "-chan," generally used to refer to young girls.

Akio Mori cited this case in support of his controversial "game brain" theory, which has been criticized as pseudoscience. Girl A was reported to be a fan of the death-themed flash animation "Red Room", a claim used in support of the theory. It was also known that Girl A had read the controversial novel Battle Royale and had seen its film adaptation, which centers on young students fighting to the death.

On March 18, 2005, during the Okubo Elementary graduation ceremony, students were given a graduation album with a blank page in honor of Mitarai's death on which they could put pictures of Mitarai, Girl A, or class pictures containing both girls. Mitarai was posthumously awarded a graduation certificate, which her father accepted on her behalf. Girl A was also awarded a certificate, as one is required in Japan in order to enter a junior high school and the school believed it would aid her "reintegration into society".

See also
Sasebo schoolgirl murder, a 2014 murder in Sasebo.

References

External links

 "Japan schoolgirl killer 'sorry – BBC News, June 3, 2004
 "現代リスクの基礎知識 第62回〜長崎佐世保女児同級生殺害事件" – Nikkei Business Publications June 10, 2004 article on the murder 

2004 murders in Japan
Murder committed by minors
Sasebo
June 2004 events in Japan
Incidents of violence against girls